The 37th Biathlon World Championships held in 2002 for the third time in Oslo, Norway were only for the mass start because these events were not part of the Olympic programme in Salt Lake City.

Men's results

15 km mass start

Women's results

12.5 km mass start

Medal table

References

2002
World Championships
International sports competitions in Oslo
2002 in Norwegian sport
February 2002 sports events in Europe
2000s in Oslo
Biathlon competitions in Norway
Holmenkollen